Huckabee is an English surname. 

The name is a variant form of the surname Huckaby and Huckerby. 

This surname originated as a habitational name, derived from Huccaby in Devon, England; this place name is derived from two Old English elements: the first, woh, meaning "crooked"; the second, byge, meaning "river bend". 

Another possibility is that Huckaby originated as a habitational name, derived from Uckerby, in North Yorkshire, England; this place name is derived from two Old Norse elements: the first is thought to be an unattested Old Norse personal name, either *Úkyrri or *Útkári; the second element is býr, meaning farmstead.

People with the surname
 Cooper Huckabee, (born 1951), US actor
 family from Arkansas
 husband Mike, (born 1955), former Arkansas governor
 wife Janet, (born 1955), and their children, including:
 daughter Sarah, (born 1982), former White House Press Secretary

References

English-language surnames
English toponymic surnames